is a Chinese character encountered in East Asian languages.

It may also refer to:

 kings, in reference to non-Chinese states
 the early Chinese sovereigns of the Xia, Shang, and Zhou dynasties (sometimes titled "emperor" in translation)
 princes of the later dynasties
 Wang (surname), a Chinese surname
 Oh (surname), a Japanese surname